CounterStrike Table Tennis is an American table tennis equipment supplier. CounterStrike was founded in 2019 and its headquarters is located Fishers, Indiana, USA.

Background 
CounterStrike was established in 2019 by Eric Baker, an amateur table tennis player. Baker was a member of his high school club team and was the president at Anderson University table tennis club in 2008. At this time, he started his own web design company, Ignition Marketing Solutions before joining Kittle Property Group as a senior marketing and communication manager, and in 2019 he started CounterStrike.

CounterStrike works with many Chinese manufacturers who supply notable table tennis equipment supplier with manufacturing materials to provide sports products, including table tennis blades and table tennis paddles which are International Table Tennis Federation-approved.

References 

2019 establishments in Indiana
Manufacturing companies based in Indiana
Manufacturing companies established in 2019
American companies established in 2019
Sporting goods brands
Sporting goods manufacturers of the United States
Tennis equipment manufacturers

External links 
 Official website